The 2008–09 season of the Hessenliga was the first season of the league at tier five (V) of the German football league system after the introduction of the 3. Fußball-Liga.

SC Waldgirmes, champions of the Hessenliga, did not meet the licensing criteria for the Fußball-Regionalliga. In their place, the Bavarian team FC Bayern Alzenau were promoted to the 2009–10 Regionalliga Süd. SV Buchonia Flieden, Borussia Fulda, KSV Hessen Kassel II and FSC Lohfelden were relegated to their respective Verbandsligen.

1. FC Schwalmstadt and SVA Bad Hersfeld from the Verbandsliga Hessen-Nord, VfB Marburg from the Verbandsliga Hessen-Mitte and FSV Frankfurt II from the Verbandsliga Hessen-Süd were promoted to the 2009–10 Hessenliga. Joining them in the Hessenliga next season are Viktoria Aschaffenburg, having been relegated from the Regionalliga.

League table

External links 
 Hessischer Fußball-Verband – official website of the Hessian Football Association 

Hessenliga seasons
Hessen